Byturidae, also known as Fruitworms, is a very small family of beetles, in the suborder Polyphaga, comprising fewer than 20 species worldwide. The larvae of some species develop in fruits. Byturus unicolor affects species of Rubus and Geum.

There are two subfamilies: Platydascillinae and Byturinae. The distribution of Byturinae is holarctic. Species of Platydascillinae are found in southeast Asia.

Classification 
Subfamilies and genera are as below:
Subfamily  Byturinae
Genus Byturodes
Byturodes grahami Barber, 1942
Genus Byturus
Byturus affinis Reitter, 1874
Byturus ochraceus (Scriba, 1791)
Byturus tomentosus (De Geer, 1774)
Byturus unicolor Say, 1823
Byturus wittmeri Sen Gupta
Genus Xerasia
Xerasia grisescens (Jayne, 1882)
Xerasia meschniggi (Reitter, 1905)
Xerasia punica Goodrich & Springer
Xerasia variegata Lewis, 1895
Subfamily Platydascillinae
Genus Bispinatus
Bispinatus capillatus Springer & Goodrich, 1995
Bispinatus vietnamensis Springer & Goodrich, 1994
Genus Dascillocyphon
Dascillocyphon minor Everts, 1909
Genus Platydascillus
Platydascillus sumatranus Everts, 1909
Genus Remigera
Remigera securiformis Springer & Goodrich, 1994
Remigera spatulata Springer & Goodrich, 1994

References

 
Cleroidea
Polyphaga families